Julian Gregory Klymkiw (July 16, 1933 – August 10, 2022) was a Canadian professional ice hockey goaltender who played in one National Hockey League game for the New York Rangers during the 1958–59 NHL season.

Klymkiw was working as the Detroit Red Wings's assistant trainer during the October 12, 1958 game between the Rangers and Red Wings at the Detroit Olympia. Early in the third period, Rangers goaltender Gump Worsley was tripped up and crashed into his own net by Gordie Howe, pulling a tendon in his left leg. Worsley was removed from the ice on a stretcher, and the Wings offered the Rangers the use of Klymkiw for the remainder of the game. Klymkiw had been a goaltender during his amateur hockey career and participated in Detroit practices. He entered the game with the Red Wings leading 1–0 and gave up two goals, one to Marcel Pronovost and one to Gordie Howe, for a 3–0 loss.

Klymkiw was also the resident goaltender for the CBS show "Shootout in the NHL", which ran in the gaps between periods of games broadcast by CBS. 

Klymkiw died on August 10, 2022.

See also
 List of players who played only one game in the NHL

References

External links
 

1933 births
2022 deaths
Brandon Wheat Kings players
Canadian ice hockey goaltenders
Canadian people of Ukrainian descent
Detroit Red Wings personnel
New York Rangers players
Ice hockey people from Winnipeg
Winnipeg Warriors (minor pro) players